Pustosyolov is a rural locality (a khutor) in Yelenovskoye Rural Settlement of Koshekhablsky District, Adygea, Russia. The population was 8 as of 2018. There are 4 streets.

Geography 
Pustosyolov is located 16 km east of Krasnogvardeyskoye (the district's administrative centre) by road. Nekrasovskaya is the nearest rural locality.

References 

Rural localities in Koshekhablsky District